Molla Esmail (also Romanized as Mollā Esmā‘īl) is a village in Sokmanabad Rural District, Safayyeh District, Khoy County, West Azerbaijan Province, Iran. At the 2006 census, its population was 125, in 15 families.

References 

Populated places in Khoy County